The 2017 Algerian Cup Final was the 53rd final of the Algerian Cup. The final took place on July 5, 2017, at Stade 5 Juillet 1962 in Algiers with kick-off at 16:30.

Route to the final

Pre-match

Details

Media coverage

External links
soccerway.com

References

Cup
Algerian Cup Finals